Ballynageeragh Portal Tomb is a dolmen and National Monument situated in County Waterford, Ireland.

Location
The tomb is located in pastureland 1 km (⅔ mile) northwest of Dunhill, near the headwaters of the Annestown River.

History

Dolmens were constructed in Ireland in the 4th millennium BC. Investigations in the late 1930s revealed cremated bone, flint and charcoal in the chamber. The tomb was (clumsily) reconstructed in 1940.

Description

The dolmen has an oval capstone, 4 × 2.65 × 0.7 m, weighing 6¾ tons. The tomb faces southwest (toward the setting sun) but the portal-stones are missing. The capstone rests on a doorstone and a cushion stone on top of the back stone. There are several side stones.

References

Archaeological sites in County Waterford
Buildings and structures in County Waterford
National Monuments in County Waterford
Dolmens in Ireland